Kit Graham (born 11 November 1995) is an English professional footballer who plays as a forward for Tottenham Hotspur of the FA Women's Super League (FA WSL). She previously played for Charlton Athletic.

Club career

Charlton Athletic 
Graham played for Charlton Athletic from age 9 to 23 and scored over 200 goals. During the 2017–18 season of the FA Women’s Premier League Southern Division, her 47 goals ranked first in the league as she led the team to earn promotion to the 2018–19 FA Women's Championship (FAWC). During the 2018–19 FAWC, she scored 16 goals in 19 games. She was subsequently named FAWC Players’ Player of the Year.

Tottenham Hotspur 
Graham signed with Tottenham Hotspur in August 2019. She scored a brace against Bristol City on 27 October leading Tottenham to a 2–0 win. She was nominated for the October's PFA Fan's Player of the Month. Graham signed a new contract with Tottenham until 2021 on 8 January 2020.

References

External links 
 Tottenham Hotspur player profile
 Charlton Women player profile
 
 

1995 births
Living people
Tottenham Hotspur F.C. Women players
Charlton Athletic W.F.C. players
English women's footballers
Women's association football forwards
FA Women's National League players
People from Chatham, Kent
Footballers from Kent
Women's Super League players